Tateki Matsuda  (born February 7, 1986) is a Japanese professional mixed martial artist, who most recently competed in the Flyweight division of the Ultimate Fighting Championship. A professional competitor since 2008, Matsuda has also formerly competed for Bellator MMA and Pancrase.

Personal life
Born in and raised in Japan, Matsuda moved to Massachusetts in the United States to further his education.  He first earned a bachelor's degree in Sports Movement Science for Coaching from Salem State University, and then graduated with a master's degree in Applied Nutrition for Fitness from Northeastern University in 2013.

Mixed martial arts career

Early career
Matsuda held an amateur record of 0-1 before making his professional MMA debut in 2008. Matsuda compiled an overall record of 10-5 competing primarily in regional promotions across New England, including a one fight stint in Bellator MMA before being signing with the UFC in the summer of 2014.

Ultimate Fighting Championship
Matsuda made his promotional debut as a short notice replacement against Chris Beal on September 5, 2014 at UFC Fight Night 50, where he replaced an injured Dustin Kimura.  Matsuda lost the fight via unanimous decision.

Matsuda made his next appearance against Joby Sanchez in a flyweight bout on January 18, 2015 at UFC Fight Night 59.  Sanchez defeated Matsuda in a back and forth fight via split decision.  Subsequently, Matsuda was released from the organization.

Post UFC 
After going 5–3 on the American and Japanese regional scene, Matsuda faced Louie Sanoudakis on April 2, 2022 at XMMA 4. He lost the bout via unanimous decision.

Mixed martial arts record

|-
| Loss
| align=center| 15–11
| Louie Sanoudakis
| Decision (unanimous)
| XMMA 4: Black Magic
| 
|align=center| 3
|align=center| 5:00
| New Orleans, Louisiana, United States
|
|-
| Loss
| align=center| 15–10
|Kin Moy
|Decision (unanimous)
|Cage Titans 47
|
|align=center| 3
|align=center| 5:00
|Plymouth, Massachusetts, United States
|
|-
| Win
|align=center| 15–9
|Matt Almy 
|Decision (unanimous) 
|CES MMA 57
|
|align=center|3
|align=center|5:00
|Lincoln, Rhode Island, United States
|
|-
| Win
|align=center| 14–9
|Joshua Ricci
|Decision (unanimous) 
|CES MMA 54
|
|align=center|3
|align=center|5:00
|Lincoln, Rhode Island, United States
|
|-
| Loss
|align=center| 13–9
|Toru Ogawa
|TKO (punches)
|Pancrase 297
|
|align=center|1
|align=center|2:50
|Tokyo, Japan 
|
|-
| Loss
|align=center| 13–8
|Senzo Ikeda
|Decision (unanimous) 
|Pancrase 285 
|
|align=center|3
|align=center|5:00
|Tokyo, Japan 
|
|-
| Win
|align=center| 13–7
|Tatsuya So 
|Decision (unanimous)
|Pancrase 280 
|
|align=center|3
|align=center|5:00
|Tokyo, Japan 
|
|-
| Win
|align=center| 12–7
|Joe Pearson
|Submission (punches)
|Legacy FC 51: Ramos vs. Vazquez
|
|align=center|1
|align=center|4:49
|Hinckley, Minnesota, United States
|
|-
| Win
|align=center| 11–7
|Johnny Campbell
| Decision (unanimous)
| Cage Titans FC 26
| 
|align=center|3
|align=center|5:00
|Plymouth, Massachusetts, United States
|
|-
| Loss
|align=center|10–7
| Joby Sanchez
| Decision (split)
| UFC Fight Night: McGregor vs. Siver
| 
|align=center|3
|align=center|5:00
|Boston, Massachusetts, United States
|
|-
| Loss
|align=center| 10–6
| Chris Beal 
| Decision (unanimous)
| UFC Fight Night: Jacare vs. Mousasi
| 
|align=center| 3
|align=center| 5:00
|Mashantucket, Connecticut, United States
| 
|-
| Win
|align=center| 10–5
| Robbie Leroux
| Submission (rear-naked choke)
| CES MMA 25
| 
|align=center| 1
|align=center| 4:53
|Lincoln, Rhode Island, United States
|
|-
| Win
|align=center| 9–5
| Matt Doherty
| Decision (unanimous)
| CES MMA 23
| 
|align=center| 3
|align=center| 5:00
|Lincoln, Rhode Island, United States
| 
|-
| Loss
|align=center| 8–5
| Paul Gorman
| Decision (split)
| NEF: Fight Night 11
| 
|align=center| 5
|align=center| 5:00
|Lewiston, Maine, United States
| 
|-
| Loss
|align=center| 8–4
| Matthew Tran
| Decision (unanimous)
| VCS: Victory Combat Sports
| 
|align=center| 3
|align=center| 5:00
|Dorchester, Massachusetts, United States
|
|-
| Win
|align=center| 8–3
| Myung Hwan Lee
| TKO (punches)
| Gladiator 49
| 
|align=center| 1
|align=center| 4:33
|Tokyo, Japan
| 
|-
| Win
|align=center| 7–3
| Johnny Campbell
| Decision (unanimous)
| Cage Titans 8: Conquer
| 
|align=center| 5
|align=center| 5:00
|Plymouth, Massachusetts, United States
|
|-
| Loss
|align=center| 6–3
| Saul Almeida
| Decision (unanimous)
| Bellator 48
| 
|align=center| 3
|align=center| 5:00
|Uncasville, Connecticut, United States
|
|-
| Win
|align=center| 6–2
| Barrington Douse
| Decision (unanimous)
| Cage Titans 4: Vengeance
| 
|align=center| 5
|align=center| 5:00
|Boston, Massachusetts, United States
| 
|-
| Win
|align=center| 5–2
| Jason Bennett
| Decision (unanimous)
| CES MMA: Snow Brawl
| 
|align=center| 3
|align=center| 5:00
|Lincoln, Rhode Island, United States
| 
|-
| Loss
|align=center| 4–2
| Anthony Leone
| Decision (split)
| Xtreme Championship Fight League 2
| 
|align=center| 5
|align=center| 5:00
|Lowell, Massachusetts, United States
| 
|-
| Win
|align=center| 4–1
| Billy Walsh
| TKO (punches)
| Xtreme Championship Fight League 1
| 
|align=center| 1
|align=center| 2:21
|Marlborough, Massachusetts, United States
| 
|-
| Win
|align=center| 3–1
| Aguilano Brando
| KO (punch)
| GFL: Global Fight League 4
| 
|align=center| 1
|align=center| 3:59
|Concord, New Hampshire, United States
| 
|-
| Loss
|align=center| 2–1
| Bill Jones
| DQ (illegal elbow)
| GFL: Global Fight League 3
| 
|align=center| 2
|align=center| 0:58
|Concord, New Hampshire, United States
| 
|-
| Win
|align=center| 2–0
| Alvaro Bobadilha
| Decision (unanimous)
| WOCS: Watch Out Combat Show 3
| 
|align=center| 3
|align=center| 5:00
|Rio de Janeiro, Brazil
| 
|-
| Win
|align=center| 1–0
| Wayne Clark
| KO (punches)
| Reality Fighting: Collision
| 
|align=center| 1
|align=center| 0:55
|Plymouth, Massachusetts, United States
| 
|-

References

External links

1986 births
Living people
Japanese male mixed martial artists
Flyweight mixed martial artists
Bantamweight mixed martial artists
Mixed martial artists utilizing Brazilian jiu-jitsu
Japanese practitioners of Brazilian jiu-jitsu
Northeastern University alumni
Salem State University alumni
People from Somerville, Massachusetts
Ultimate Fighting Championship male fighters